2019 in film is an overview of events, including the highest-grossing films, award ceremonies, critics' lists of the best films of 2019, festivals, a list of country-specific lists of films released, and movie programming.

Evaluation of the year
In his article highlighting the best movies of 2019, Richard Brody of The New Yorker said, "It's the year of apocalyptic cinema of the highest order, the year in which three of our best filmmakers have responded with vast ambition, invention, and inspiration to the crises at hand, including the threats to American democracy, the catastrophic menaces arising from global warming, the corrosive cruelty of ethnic hatreds and nationalist prejudices, and the poisonous overconcentration of money and power. At the same time, it's a year of inside-movies practicalities, of special attention to the business at hand, because of the structural threats to the movie business from new and powerful players. The major crisis specific to cinema outleaps even the great merits of individual movies and invokes basic and comprehensive questions of which movies can be seen and how those movies are acknowledged. It's a terrific year for movies, but it would seem much less so if we only considered movies in wide release. Versions of that refrain come up every year, but what used to be merely a gap between the multiplexes and limited releases has now become an abyss."

Highest-grossing films

The top films released in 2019 by worldwide gross are as follows:

Avengers: Endgame became the fifth film to gross $2 billion worldwide and the highest-grossing film of all time. The Lion King, Frozen II, Spider-Man: Far From Home, Captain Marvel, Joker, Star Wars: The Rise of Skywalker, Toy Story 4, and Aladdin all grossed $1 billion, with the second, third, and eighth as the first, second, and fifth highest-grossing animated films, respectively. Joker became the first R-rated film in history to surpass $1 billion.

2019 box office records
The Marvel Cinematic Universe became the first film franchise to gross $18 billion, $19 billion, $20 billion, $21 billion, and $22 billion with the release of Captain Marvel, Avengers: Endgame, and Spider-Man: Far From Home.
 The Star Wars franchise became the second film franchise to gross $10billion with the release of Star Wars: The Rise of Skywalker.
The month's highest-grossing film was the domestic Chinese film The Wandering Earth, while the highest-grossing foreign film that month was Alita: Battle Angel.

Studio records
 Walt Disney Studios became the first studio in history to surpass $10 billion in worldwide box office grosses in a year.
 Spider-Man: Far From Home became Sony Pictures' highest-grossing film. The record would be surpassed by 2021's Spider-Man: No Way Home.
 With Toy Story 4, Pixar became the first animation studio to have four animated films (along with Toy Story 3, Finding Dory, and Incredibles 2) each surpass $1 billion at the worldwide box office, and also the second animated film series to have two installments surpass $1 billion at the worldwide box office, after the Despicable Me franchise in 2017.

Film records
 The Wandering Earth set the all-time opening record in China, grossing  in its first seven days, which also made it the second biggest opening in any territory (after Star Wars: The Force Awakens in North America).
 Pokémon Detective Pikachu earned the best North American opening for a film based on a video game, with a  debut. By June 14, 2019, Detective Pikachu became the highest-grossing video game film adaptation in North America, surpassing Lara Croft: Tomb Raider (2001).
 Avengers: Endgame set numerous box office records, including becoming the highest-grossing film of all time.
 Capernaum became the highest-grossing Middle-Eastern film of all time, having earned more than  worldwide (including  in China) by 16 May 2019.
 Aladdin became the highest-grossing release of all time in the Middle East, and had the year's biggest opening weekend for a foreign film as well as this year's highest-grossing foreign film in Japan to date. The film has also surpassed Independence Day (1996) to become the highest-grossing film of Will Smith's career. The film also became the highest-grossing Disney film ever in South Korea, not including films from the Marvel Cinematic Universe.
 In June, Toy Story 4 set the record for the biggest opening for an animated film, with $244.5 million. However, the record was surpassed the following month by The Lion King, which grossed $246 million. The latter then became the fastest animated film to gross $1 billion worldwide, doing so in 21 days, surpassing Incredibles 2 (46 days). The Lion King then surpassed Frozen (2013) to become the highest-grossing animated film and highest-grossing musical film of all time in only 31 days. On the other hand, Toy Story 4 surpassed Toy Story 3 to become the highest-grossing film of the series.
 The Lion King set the record for the widest opening weekend and widest release ever for North American film history, with 4,725 and 4,802 theaters, respectively. On August 11, the film surpassed Beauty and the Beast (2017) as the highest-grossing remake of all time worldwide. On August 26, the film become the first animated film to grossed $1 billion at overseas box office outside North America.
The Lion King was also the first animated film since Finding Nemo in 2003 to be at the time the highest-grossing animated film of all time but not the highest-grossing film of its year overall.
 Ne Zha set the record for the biggest opening for an animated film in China, with $91.5 million, this was also the highest for a non-Hollywood animated film. It later became the first non-Hollywood animated film to earn $500 million (in 17 days), $600 million (in 25 days), and $700 million (in 46 days) and the first animated film not released by Universal, Disney, or Fox to do so.
 Joker became the highest-grossing R-rated film of all time, and the first R-rated film to pass the billion-dollar mark at the worldwide box office.
 In November, Frozen II surpassed the record set by The Lion King earlier in July, as the biggest opening weekend for an animated and musical film with $358.5 million worldwide.
 2019 is the first year to have nine films cross the billion-dollar milestone, surpassing 2015's and 2018's record of five billion-dollar films. Additionally, Disney (not counting Marvel Studios or Lucasfilm) saw four films cross $1 billion, the studio's highest amount in any calendar year.

Events
 March 20 – The Walt Disney Company completes its acquisition of the assets of 21st Century Fox, which includes 20th Century Fox and its subsidiaries.
 April 26 – Avengers: Endgame is released in theatres worldwide, breaking many box-office records, including becoming the second highest grossing movie of all time.
 November 23 – After disorder following screening of the gang-themed UK film Blue Story (released the previous day) at Star City, in Birmingham, England, UK cinema chains cancel all screenings of the film.
 December 4 - CBS and Viacom agreed to merge back into one entity after 13 years. Both companies came to an agreement on the management team for the merger. The reunited company's new name is ViacomCBS.

Award ceremonies

Festivals
List of some of the film festivals for 2019 that have been accredited by the International Federation of Film Producers Associations (FIAPF).

Awards

List of 2019 films

The list of films released in 2019, arranged by country, are as follows:
 List of American films of 2019
 List of Argentine films of 2019
 List of Australian films of 2019
 List of Bangladeshi films of 2019
 List of British films of 2019
 List of Canadian films of 2019
 List of Chinese films of 2019
 List of Filipino films of 2019
 List of French films of 2019
 List of Hong Kong films of 2019
 List of Indian films of 2019
 List of Indonesian films
 List of Japanese films of 2019
 List of Malaysian films of 2019
 List of Maldivian films of 2019
 List of Pakistani films of 2019
 List of Portuguese films of 2019
 List of Russian films of 2019
 List of South Korean films of 2019
 List of Turkish films

Deaths

Film debuts
 Roman Griffin Davis – Jojo Rabbit
 Lizzo – Uglydolls
 JD McCrary – Little
 Bebe Rexha – Uglydolls

Notes

References

 
Film by year
Film
Mass media timelines by year